The Jamsil Bridge crosses the Han River in South Korea and connects the districts of Songpa-gu and Gwangjin-gu. Completed in 1972, it is the 6th bridge to be constructed over the Han River.

References

Bridges in Seoul
Buildings and structures in Songpa District
Buildings and structures in Gwangjin District
Bridges completed in 1972